Stig-André Berge (born 20 July 1983) is a Greco-Roman wrestler from Norway who competes in the 59–60 kg category. He won bronze medals at the 2014 World Championships and 2016 Olympics. 2018 World Championships runner-up.

Berge took up wrestling in 1987. He is engaged to Rosell Utne. His mother died of cancer in 2016.

In March 2021, he competed at the European Qualification Tournament in Budapest, Hungary hoping to qualify for the 2020 Summer Olympics in Tokyo, Japan. In May 2021, he also failed to qualify for the Olympics at the World Olympic Qualification Tournament held in Sofia, Bulgaria.

Personal life
Berge was born in Oslo on 20 July 1983. His father Bjørn Berge is a former junior national champion in wrestling.

References

External links

Norwegian male sport wrestlers
1983 births
Living people
Sportspeople from Oslo
Wrestlers at the 2008 Summer Olympics
Wrestlers at the 2012 Summer Olympics
Wrestlers at the 2016 Summer Olympics
Olympic wrestlers of Norway
European Games competitors for Norway
Wrestlers at the 2015 European Games
Medalists at the 2016 Summer Olympics
Olympic medalists in wrestling
Olympic bronze medalists for Norway
World Wrestling Championships medalists
21st-century Norwegian people